Macrauzata maxima is a moth in the family Drepanidae. It was described by Inoue in 1960. It is found in Japan and the Chinese provinces of Sichuan, Zhejiang, Yunnan, Hunan, Fujian and Jiangsu.

Subspecies
Macrauzata maxima maxima (Japan)
Macrauzata maxima chinensis Inoue, 1960 (China: Sichuan, Zhejiang, Yunnan, Hunan, Fujian, Jiangsu)

References

Moths described in 1960
Drepaninae